Baird Cove is a bay in the U.S. state of Washington.

Baird Cove has the name of Edmund Baird, a landowner.

References

Landforms of Thurston County, Washington
Bays of Washington (state)